Nameri National Park is a national park in the foothills of the eastern Himalayas in the Sonitpur District of Assam, India, about 35 km from Tezpur. Nameri is about 9 km from Chariduar, the nearest village.

Nameri shares its northern boundary with the Pakhui Wildlife Sanctuary of Arunachal Pradesh. Nameri National Park was declared as Tiger Reserve in the year 1999-2000, and is the second Tiger reserve of Assam after Manas Tiger Reserve. It has two core areas: Nameri National Park and Sonai- Rupai Wildlife (Satellite Core of the Nameri Tiger Reserve). The river Jia-Bhoroli is the lifeline of Nameri, which flows along the southern boundary of the park from northwest to southeast. In the east, the river Bor-Dikorai is a tributary of river Jia-Bhoroli, flowing along the southern boundary from northeast to southwest.

Rivers 

The Kameng River of Assam was famous since the time of British for the golden mahseer angling. The angling was officially banned in 2011. The main Rivers are Jia- Bhoroli and Bor Dikorai. Other tributaries of these two rivers are: Diji, Dinai, Nameri, Khari, Upper Dikiri which originates in the Arunachal Himalayas and flows through Pakke TR and Nameri TR.

History
The park was declared a reserve forest on 17 October 1978. Until then the Nameri National Park was heavily used for logging. Another  was added on 15 November 1998 when it was officially established as a National Park.

Flora

Nameri National Park harbours over 600 floral species. Some notable species are Gmelina arborea, Michelia champaca, Amoora wallichi, Chukrasia tabularis, Ajar, Urium poma, Bhelu, Agaru, Rudraksha, Bonjolokia, Hatipolia akhakan, Hollock, Nahor. It is home for orchids like Dendrobium, Cymbidium and Cypripedioideae.

Fauna

Nameri National Park provides habitat for Bengal tiger, Indian leopard, clouded leopard, marbled cat, leopard cat, hog deer, sambar, dhole, gaur, barking deer, wild boar, sloth bear, Himalayan black bear, capped langur and Indian giant squirrel.
The white winged wood duck, great pied hornbill, wreathed hornbill, rufous necked hornbill, black stork, ibisbill, blue-bearded bee-eaters, babblers, plovers and many other birds are also present.

In 2005, 374 bird species were recorded in Nameri National Park.

Conflicts and threats
Nameri faces two threats: One is due to continued official logging in the area of Sonitpur. The other major threat for Nameri is human/animal conflict due to around 3000 cattle grazing the forest. There is another human/animal conflict due to the vast group of elephants in Nameri.  The human-elephant conflict arose mainly due to herds of elephants raiding crops, damaging homes, and killing cattle. In a study published in November 2011, researchers found correlation between the human-elephant conflict and forest cover dropping below 30-40%. There are several cases of elephant deaths. In 2001 there were 18 elephant deaths.

References

External links

Brahmaputra Valley semi-evergreen forests
Tiger reserves of India
National parks in Assam
Tourism in Northeast India
Tourism in Assam
1978 establishments in Assam
Protected areas established in 1978